The Opglabbeek Formation is a geologic formation in the subsurface of the eastern part of Belgian Limburg. The heterogeneous formation consists of clay and sand that was deposited lagoonaly and fluvially during the early Selandian (Middle Paleocene, about 60 million years old). The formation is named after the town of Opglabbeek in Limburg.

The Opglabbeek Formation is subdivided into two members: the Opoeteren Member (red clay with layers of lignite) and the Eisden Member (fine sand with crags).

It lies stratigraphically on top of the Houthem Formation (early Paleocene calcareous sandstone). It is the lateral equivalent of the Hainin Formation. On top of it lies the Heers Formation (Middle Paleocene sands and marls). The Opglabbeek Formation is part of the Hesbaye Group and can be correlated with parts of the Landen Formation of adjacent areas in the southern Netherlands.

References 

Geologic formations of Belgium
Paleocene Series of Europe
Paleogene Belgium